Ronald Hugo Fuentes Núñez (born 22 June 1969) is a Chilean football manager and former player who played as a defender. He is the current manager of Unión Española.

Club career
Fuentes played his entire club career in Chile for two teams, he started his career in 1987 with Cobresal, and in 1994 he joined Universidad de Chile where he won four league titles and two Copa Chile titles.

International career
At international level, Fuentes was capped 50 times and scored 1 goal for the Chile national team between 1991 and 2000, including four games at the 1998 FIFA World Cup.

Honours

Club
Cobresal
 Copa Chile (1): 1987

Club
Universidad de Chile
 Primera División de Chile (4): 1994, 1995, 1999, 2000
 Copa Chile (2): 1998, 2000

References

External links

1969 births
Living people
Chilean footballers
Chile international footballers
People from Santiago
People from Santiago Province, Chile
People from Santiago Metropolitan Region
Footballers from Santiago
Universidad de Chile footballers
Cobresal footballers
Chilean Primera División players
1998 FIFA World Cup players
1991 Copa América players
1995 Copa América players
Association football defenders
Chilean Primera División managers
Primera B de Chile managers
Chilean football managers
Deportes Melipilla managers
Deportes Iberia managers
Universidad de Concepción managers
Unión Española managers
Santiago Wanderers managers
Rangers de Talca managers
Audax Italiano managers